Spirits Of Heaven and Ways of Heaven & Earth: Shamanistic Beliefs and Origins of Chinese Traditional Thoughts is a book by a Taiwanese history professor Olga Gorodetskaya, published in 2016 in Shanghai, China. The book is a treatise on early Chinese religious and philosophical beliefs.

References

2016 non-fiction books
Chinese philosophy
Shamanism in China
Ancient China